

Places

Mountain ranges
 Sierra Nevada (United States), in the western United States.
 Sierra Nevada (Spain), in southern Spain
 Sierra Nevada, the Trans-Mexican Volcanic Belt, in central-southern Mexico
 Sierra Nevada de Lagunas Bravas, a volcanic complex in Chile and Argentina
 Sierra Nevada de Mérida, in Venezuela
 Sierra Nevada de Santa Marta, in Colombia
 Sierra Nevada del Cocuy, another mountain range in Colombia

Other locations
 Sierra Nevada (stratovolcano), a volcano in Chile
 Sierra Nevada National Park (Spain) 
 Sierra Nevada National Park (Venezuela)
 Sierra Nevada Ski Station, a ski resort in Spain

Other uses
 Sierra Nevada (ferry), a ferry operated on San Francisco Bay 
 macOS Sierra, version 10.12 of the macOS operating system
 Sierra Nevada Brewing Company, a California beer brewer
 Sierra Nevada Corporation, an aerospace contractor

See also
 Sieranevada, 2016 Romanian film
 Nevada (disambiguation)
 Sierra (disambiguation)